The 1938 Grand National was the 97th renewal of the Grand National horse race that took place at Aintree near Liverpool, England, on 25 March 1938.

The steeplechase was won narrowly by American thoroughbred Battleship, a 40/1 shot ridden by 17-year-old jockey Bruce Hobbs and trained by Reg Hobbs, for owner Marion duPont Scott. Royal Danieli finished in second place, with Workman third and last year's second-placed Cooleen was fourth. Workman won the National the following year and Cooleen also finished fourth in 1939.

Battleship is the only horse to have won both the Grand National at Aintree and the American Grand National.

Thirty-six horses ran in the race, including the previous year's winner Royal Mail, who was pulled-up before the second Canal Turn with a broken blood vessel.

Media Coverage and Aftermath
Winning rider Bruce Hobbs later explained that he had Fred Rimell to thank in part for his victory. Hobbs stated that Battleship had landed very steeply at Becher's Brook and cut his chin on the ground, causing the pair to come to the seventh fence wrong. Battleship had to veer sharply to take the jump and as Hobbs stated. "He caught me off balance and I was starting to fall off when suddenly I got a push up the bum back into the saddle" [From Rimell]. Of the finish Hobbs stated "I didn't hit the little horse because he wouldn't go for the stick, but he gave everything and got up and won. I thought it was half a length but they gave it as a head and all the Irish said if there was a photograph I would have been second." Hobbs himself never raced in the National again after a fall later that year resulted in a back injury that ended his riding career.

Finishing order

Non-finishers

References

 1938
Grand National
Grand National
20th century in Lancashire
Grand National